The G-Unity Foundation Inc., (more commonly abbreviated as G-Unity) is an American nonprofit public foundation established by rapper 50 Cent and his group G-Unit. The foundation provides grants to nonprofit organizations that focus on improving the quality of life for low-income and underserved communities across the United States. The main goals of the charity are to emphasize the critical importance of supporting academic institutions, to support nonprofit organizations that focus on the academic enrichment of a child, and to support after school activities.

References

External links
Official Website

2003 establishments in New York City
Educational foundations in the United States
G-Unit
Charities based in New York City
Organizations established in 2003